More Money Less Grief is the debut album of the indie rock band, The Metros. It was released on September 15, 2008, and recorded at 1965 Records.

Track listing

Bonus tracks

Singles

"Education Pt. 2" (March 17, 2008, 1965 Records) 
"Last of the Lookers" (June 2, 2008, 1965 Records) 
"Talk About It" (September 8, 2008, 1965 Records)

2008 debut albums